The British Classic is a darts tournament that has been held annually since 1997.

List of winners

Men's

Women's

Youth

Girls

Tournament records
 Most wins 3:  Mervyn King. 
 Most Finals 4:  Mervyn King. 
 Most Semi Finals 5:  Gary Anderson.
 Most Quarter Finals 6:  Gary Anderson.
 Most Appearances 12:  John Walton.
 Most Prize Money won £5,175:  Ross Montgomery.
 Best winning average (98.22) :  Glen Durrant v's Jamie Hughes 2015 Semi Final.
 Youngest Winner age 22:   Jan Dekker. 
 Oldest Winner age 47:  Ross Montgomery.

References

External links

British Darts Organisation tournaments
Darts in the United Kingdom
1997 establishments in the United Kingdom
2019 disestablishments in the United Kingdom
Recurring sporting events established in 1997
Recurring sporting events disestablished in 2019